Belfast is an unincorporated community in Marshall County, Tennessee, United States. The area ZIP code is 37019.

History
A post office was established at Belfast in 1836. The community was named after Belfast, in Northern Ireland. The first commercial business in Belfast opened in 1838.

1952 Tornado
On February 29, 1952, a weak, but catastrophic F1 tornado hit the town, killing three and injuring 166. As of 2022, this is the most injuries ever caused by an F1/EF1 tornado in the United States, although sources vary tremendously on the actual casualty toll.

Notes

Unincorporated communities in Marshall County, Tennessee
Unincorporated communities in Tennessee